Monster Farm is a short-lived animated series from Saban Entertainment that aired on Fox Family. It aired on one of the channel's animation blocks for one season, from 1998 to 1999. Ownership of the series passed to Disney in 2001 when Disney acquired Fox Kids Worldwide, which also includes Saban Entertainment. The series is not available on Disney+.

Plot
The series was about a young man from the city named Jack Haylee and the farm he inherits from his great-uncle Harloff. What he finds when he arrives is a bizarre collection of farm animals. Together, this unlikely menagerie must work to help their new owner save their home from the curiosity-seekers who threaten their wacky world.

Development
It was created and developed for television by Taylor Grant. Alex Borstein and Steve Marmel were brought in to write some of the episodes.

Episodes
52 ten-minute shorts were produced and aired in German. Only 26 of these shorts aired in English as 13 half-hours.

Characters
 Robbie Rist – Jack Haylee
 Bruce Mahler – Count Cluckula, Dr. Woolly/Mr. Ewe sheep, Rams
 Rodger Bumpass – Frankenswine, Goatasaurus Rex
 Kevin Killebrew – Cowapatra
 Jess Harnell – Jimmy Earl, Dad
 Tifanie Christun – Zombeef
 Dan Woren – Pa

Foreign dubbings
The series was dubbed into Brazilian Portuguese with the name Rancho Assombrado (English: "Haunted Ranch"). The Brazilian dub was broadcast in the late nineties as part of the Fox Kids television programming.

References

External links
Monster Farm at Internet Movie Database

1998 American television series debuts
1999 American television series endings
1990s American animated television series
American children's animated comedy television series
English-language television shows
Fox Family Channel original programming
Television series by Saban Entertainment
Television shows set on farms
Inheritances in fiction